Saint-Gingolph is a commune in the Haute-Savoie department in the Auvergne-Rhône-Alpes region in south-eastern France. It lies at the outflow of the river Morge into Lake Geneva. With the adjacent Swiss municipality Saint-Gingolph, it forms one built up area. The Morge forms the border with Switzerland.

See also
Communes of the Haute-Savoie department

References

Communes of Haute-Savoie
Divided cities